John Paul Mayock (born 26 October 1970, in Barnsley) is a retired male English middle distance runner.

Athletics career
Mayock has competed at three Olympic Games, at the 1996 games in Atlanta and the 2000 games in Sydney in the 1500 m and at the 2004 games in Athens in the 5000 m.  He has also competed at three Commonwealth Games, in 1994 in 1994 Commonwealth Games Victoria and 1998 in Kuala Lumpur, where he won bronze and silver medals in the 1500 m. He placed fourth in the 5,000, at the 2002 Commonwealth Games in Manchester. He currently holds British indoor records for the 2000 m (4:57.09) and 2 miles (8:17.06). His previous record in the 3000 m (7:41.09) was broken by Mo Farah in 2009. Mayock represented Great Britain 58 times during his career. He has run an impressive 3:31.86 for 1500m and a mile in 3:50.32. Represented Great Britain 58 times and Team Captain.

Competition record

References

1970 births
Living people
English male middle-distance runners
Athletes (track and field) at the 1996 Summer Olympics
Athletes (track and field) at the 2000 Summer Olympics
Athletes (track and field) at the 2004 Summer Olympics
Olympic athletes of Great Britain
Athletes (track and field) at the 1994 Commonwealth Games
Athletes (track and field) at the 1998 Commonwealth Games
Commonwealth Games silver medallists for England
Commonwealth Games bronze medallists for England
Alumni of Staffordshire University
Commonwealth Games medallists in athletics
Universiade medalists in athletics (track and field)
Universiade gold medalists for Great Britain
Medalists at the 1991 Summer Universiade
Competitors at the 2001 Goodwill Games
Medallists at the 1994 Commonwealth Games
Medallists at the 1998 Commonwealth Games